WLG may refer to:

 Wellington International Airport (IATA code), Wellington, New Zealand
 White light generation, a process broadening the spectrum of a laser pulse
 William Lloyd Garrison, a U.S. abolitionist
 Without loss of generality, a frequently used expression in mathematics